Geißhorn is a mountain in the Allgäu Alps of Bavaria, Germany.

Mountains of Bavaria
Allgäu Alps
Mountains of the Alps